Equanimeous Tristan Imhotep J. St. Brown (born September 30, 1996) is an American football wide receiver for the Chicago Bears of the National Football League (NFL). He played college football at Notre Dame and was drafted by the Green Bay Packers in the sixth round of the 2018 NFL Draft.

Early life
St. Brown attended Servite High School in Anaheim, California. While there, he played high school football for the Friars football team. He committed to the University of Notre Dame to play college football. St. Brown's father is body builder John Brown, a three time Mr. World. St. Brown's mother, Miriam Brown, is German, and he speaks fluent German. He holds both American and German citizenship.

College career
St. Brown played at Notre Dame from 2015 to 2017 under head coach Brian Kelly. After his junior season in 2017, he decided to forgo his senior year and enter the 2018 NFL Draft. He finished his career with 123 receptions for 2,193 yards and 19 touchdowns.

College statistics

Professional career

Green Bay Packers
St. Brown was drafted by the Green Bay Packers in the sixth round with the 207th overall pick in the 2018 NFL Draft. He signed his rookie contract on May 7, 2018.

St. Brown made his NFL debut in Week 1 against the Chicago Bears on special teams. In a Week 5 loss to the Detroit Lions, St. Brown recorded his first three professional catches, which went for 89 yards, including a 54-yard catch-and-run near the end of the game. On October 15 against the San Francisco 49ers on Monday Night Football, with 15 seconds left in the game, he recorded a key 19-yard catch that helped set up a game-winning field goal by Mason Crosby.

During a preseason game against the Oakland Raiders on August 22, 2019, St. Brown suffered a serious ankle injury, later reported to be a high ankle sprain. The Packers placed him on injured reserve on August 31, ending his 2019 season before it began.

On September 19, 2020, St. Brown was placed on injured reserve. He was activated on October 17, 2020. On December 27, 2020, St. Brown caught his first NFL touchdown, a 21-yard reception from Aaron Rodgers, during a 40–14 Week 16 victory over the Tennessee Titans on Sunday Night Football.

On August 31, 2021, Packers waived St. Brown as part of their final roster cuts, but was signed to the practice squad the next day. On September 21, 2021, St. Brown was elevated to the active roster and sent back to the practice squad the next day. On October 3, 2021, St. Brown was once again elevated to the active roster and sent back to the practice squad two days later. On October 9, 2021, St. Brown was elevated to the active roster, and then reverted back to practice squad again. Four days later the Packers signed him to the active roster.

Chicago Bears
On March 18, 2022, St. Brown signed a one-year contract with the Chicago Bears.

On January 4, 2023, St. Brown signed a one-year, $1.25 million contract extension with the Bears.

NFL career statistics

Regular season

Postseason

Personal life
St. Brown speaks fluent French and German in addition to his native English. He used all three languages when he announced his commitment to play football at Notre Dame in 2015.

He has two younger brothers, Osiris and Amon-Ra; both are wide receivers. The three brothers' last name is St. Brown, while their parents' last name is Brown. Osiris played for the Stanford Cardinal and was previously a four-star recruit coming out of Mater Dei High School in California, while Amon-Ra played for USC before being drafted by the Detroit Lions in the 2021 NFL Draft. Their father, John, is a former Mr. Universe. St. Brown's mother, Miriam Brown née Steyer, is from Leverkusen, Germany.

References

External links
https://www.chicagobears.com/team/players-roster/equanimeous-st-brown/ Chicago Bears bio]
Notre Dame Fighting Irish bio

1996 births
Living people
American football wide receivers
American people of German descent
Chicago Bears players
German players of American football
Green Bay Packers players
Notre Dame Fighting Irish football players
People from Placentia, California
Players of American football from California
Servite High School alumni
Sportspeople from Orange County, California